A blinker is a type of automotive lighting (directional indicator).

Blinker may also refer to:
 Blinders, also called "blinkers" or "winkers," a piece of horse tack used on a horse's bridle to restrict the horse's vision
 "Blinkers", a stabilising device created by the Wright Brothers in 1905 for their early aircraft. (see also winglets)
 Blinker light, a naval signal lamp device; also sometimes used as a verb indicating use of such a device
 Blink comparator to detect changes in images

People with the name
 Regi Blinker (born 1969), Dutch former professional footballer
William Reginald Hall, known as "blinker".

See also
 Blink (disambiguation)